Vakhtang Chanturishvili (born 5 August 1993) is a Georgian footballer who plays for Trinity Zlín as a left winger.

Club career
Chanturishvili started his career in Norchi Dinamoeli. He made his debut for the team on 23 August 2013 in a match against FC Samgurali Tskhaltubo.

International career
In May 2016, Chanturishvili was called up  and earned his first cap with the senior team in a 3–1 loss against Slovakia on 27 May, he started and was replaced in the 45th minute by Levan Kenia.

Honours
Zestafoni
 Georgian League: 2011–12
 Georgian Super Cup: 2012, 2013

Dinamo Tbilisi
 Georgian League: 2015–16
 Georgian Cup: 2014–15, 2015–16
 Georgian Super Cup: 2015

Spartak Trnava
 Slovak Super Liga: 2017–18

References

External links

 
 
 FC Dinamo Tbilisi official Profile

Living people
1993 births
Footballers from Georgia (country)
Georgia (country) international footballers
Association football midfielders
FC Zestafoni players
FC Dinamo Tbilisi players
FC Oleksandriya players
Ukrainian Premier League players
Expatriate footballers in Ukraine
Expatriate sportspeople from Georgia (country) in Ukraine
FC Spartak Trnava players
Slovak Super Liga players
Expatriate footballers in Slovakia
Expatriate sportspeople from Georgia (country) in Slovakia
Expatriate footballers in the Czech Republic
Expatriate sportspeople from Georgia (country) in the Czech Republic
FC Fastav Zlín players
Czech First League players